Accelerations in special relativity (SR) follow, as in Newtonian Mechanics, by differentiation of velocity with respect to time. Because of the Lorentz transformation and time dilation, the concepts of time and distance become more complex, which also leads to more complex definitions of "acceleration". SR as the theory of flat Minkowski spacetime remains valid in the presence of accelerations, because general relativity (GR) is only required when there is curvature of spacetime caused by the energy–momentum tensor (which is mainly determined by mass). However, since the amount of spacetime curvature is not particularly high on Earth or its vicinity, SR remains valid for most practical purposes, such as experiments in particle accelerators.

One can derive transformation formulas for ordinary accelerations in three spatial dimensions (three-acceleration or coordinate acceleration) as measured in an external inertial frame of reference, as well as for the special case of proper acceleration measured by a comoving accelerometer. Another useful formalism is four-acceleration, as its components can be connected in different inertial frames by a Lorentz transformation. Also equations of motion can be formulated which connect acceleration and force. Equations for several forms of acceleration of bodies and their curved world lines follow from these formulas by integration. Well known special cases are hyperbolic motion for constant longitudinal proper acceleration or uniform circular motion. Eventually, it is also possible to describe these phenomena in accelerated frames in the context of special relativity, see Proper reference frame (flat spacetime). In such frames, effects arise which are analogous to homogeneous gravitational fields, which have some formal similarities to the real, inhomogeneous gravitational fields of curved spacetime in general relativity. In the case of hyperbolic motion one can use Rindler coordinates, in the case of uniform circular motion one can use Born coordinates.

Concerning the historical development, relativistic equations containing accelerations can already be found in the early years of relativity, as summarized in early textbooks by Max von Laue (1911, 1921) or Wolfgang Pauli (1921). For instance, equations of motion and acceleration transformations were developed in the papers of Hendrik Antoon Lorentz (1899, 1904), Henri Poincaré (1905), Albert Einstein (1905), Max Planck (1906), and four-acceleration, proper acceleration, hyperbolic motion, accelerating reference frames, Born rigidity, have been analyzed by Einstein (1907), Hermann Minkowski (1907, 1908), Max Born (1909), Gustav Herglotz (1909), Arnold Sommerfeld (1910), von Laue (1911), Friedrich Kottler (1912, 1914), see section on history.

Three-acceleration

In accordance with both Newtonian mechanics and SR, three-acceleration or coordinate acceleration  is the first derivative of velocity  with respect to coordinate time or the second derivative of the location  with respect to coordinate time:

.

However, the theories sharply differ in their predictions in terms of the relation between three-accelerations measured in different inertial frames.

.

On the contrary in SR, both  and  depend on the Lorentz transformation, therefore also three-acceleration  and its components vary in different inertial frames.

or for arbitrary velocities  of magnitude :

or starting from  this procedure gives the result for the general case of arbitrary directions of velocities and accelerations:

As with the velocity addition formulas, also these acceleration transformations guarantee that the resultant speed of the accelerated object can never reach or surpass the speed of light.

Four-acceleration

where  is the object's three-acceleration and  its momentary three-velocity of magnitude  with the corresponding Lorentz factor .

Another property of four-vectors is the invariance of the inner product  or its magnitude , which gives in this case:

Proper acceleration

In infinitesimal small durations there is always one inertial frame, which momentarily has the same velocity as the accelerated body, and in which the Lorentz transformation holds. The corresponding three-acceleration  in these frames can be directly measured by an accelerometer, and is called proper acceleration or rest acceleration.

Thus the magnitude of four-acceleration corresponds to the magnitude of proper acceleration.

Acceleration and force

The relation between three-force and three-acceleration for arbitrary directions of the velocity is thus

Therefore, the Newtonian definition of mass as the ratio of three-force and three-acceleration is disadvantageous in SR, because such a mass would depend both on velocity and direction. Consequently, the following mass definitions used in older textbooks are not used anymore:

 as "longitudinal mass",

 as "transverse mass".

The relation between three-acceleration and three-force can also be obtained from the equation of motion

where  is the three-momentum.

Proper acceleration and proper force 

The force  in a momentary inertial frame measured by a comoving spring balance can be called proper force. Thus by  where only accelerations parallel (x-direction) or perpendicular (y-, z-direction) to the velocity  are considered:

Since in momentary inertial frames one has four-force  and four-acceleration , equation produces the Newtonian relation , therefore can be summarized

By that, the apparent contradiction in the historical definitions of transverse mass  can be explained. Einstein (1905) described the relation between three-acceleration and proper force

,

while Lorentz (1899, 1904) and Planck (1906) described the relation between three-acceleration and three-force

.

Curved world lines

By integration of the equations of motion one obtains the curved world lines of accelerated bodies corresponding to a sequence of momentary inertial frames (here, the expression "curved" is related to the form of the worldlines in Minkowski diagrams, which should not be confused with "curved" spacetime of general relativity). In connection with this, the so-called clock hypothesis of clock postulate has to be considered: The proper time of comoving clocks is independent of acceleration, that is, the time dilation of these clocks as seen in an external inertial frame only depends on its relative velocity with respect to that frame. Two simple cases of curved world lines are now provided by integration of equation for proper acceleration:

a) Hyperbolic motion: The constant, longitudinal proper acceleration  by  leads to the world line

The worldline corresponds to the hyperbolic equation , from which the name hyperbolic motion is derived. These equations are often used for the calculation of various scenarios of the twin paradox or Bell's spaceship paradox, or in relation to space travel using constant acceleration.

b) The constant, transverse proper acceleration  by  can be seen as a centripetal acceleration, leading to the worldline of a body in uniform rotation

A classification of curved worldlines can be obtained by using the differential geometry of triple curves, which can be expressed by spacetime Frenet-Serret formulas. In particular, it can be shown that hyperbolic motion and uniform circular motion are special cases of motions having constant curvatures and torsions, satisfying the condition of Born rigidity. A body is called Born rigid if the spacetime distance between its infinitesimally separated worldlines or points remains constant during acceleration.

Accelerated reference frames

Instead of inertial frames, these accelerated motions and curved worldlines can also be described using accelerated or curvilinear coordinates. The proper reference frame established that way is closely related to Fermi coordinates. For instance, the coordinates for an hyperbolically accelerated reference frame are sometimes called Rindler coordinates, or those of a uniformly rotating reference frame are called rotating cylindrical coordinates (or sometimes Born coordinates). In terms of the equivalence principle, the effects arising in these accelerated frames are analogous to effects in a homogeneous, fictitious gravitational field. In this way it can be seen, that the employment of accelerating frames in SR produces important mathematical relations, which (when further developed) play a fundamental role in the description of real, inhomogeneous gravitational fields in terms of curved spacetime in general relativity.

History

For further information see von Laue, Pauli, Miller, Zahar, Gourgoulhon, and the historical sources in history of special relativity.

If he had set , his expressions would have assumed the exact relativistic form.
1904 Lorentz derived the previous relations in a more detailed way, namely with respect to the properties of particles resting in the system  and the moving system , with the new auxiliary variable  equal to  compared to the one in 1899, thus:
This time, Lorentz could show that , by which his formulas assume the exact relativistic form. He also formulated the equation of motion
 with 
Furthermore, he argued, that these formulas should not only hold for forces and masses of electrically charged particles, but for other processes as well so that the earth's motion through the aether remains undetectable.
1905 Henri Poincaré introduced the transformation of three-force:

As Lorentz, he set .
1905 Albert Einstein derived the equations of motions on the basis of his special theory of relativity, which represent the relation between equally valid inertial frames without the action of a mechanical aether. Einstein concluded, that in a momentary inertial frame  the equations of motion retain their Newtonian form:
.
By transformation into a relatively moving system  he obtained the equations for the electrical and magnetic components observed in that frame:
.
Consequently, Einstein determined the longitudinal and transverse mass, even though he related it to the force  in the momentary rest frame measured by a comoving spring balance, and to the three-acceleration  in system :

1905 Poincaré introduces the transformation of three-acceleration:

Furthermore, he introduced the four-force in the form:

1906 Max Planck derived the equation of motion

with
 and 
and

1907 Einstein analyzed a uniformly accelerated reference frame and obtained formulas for coordinate dependent time dilation and speed of light, analogous to those given by Kottler-Møller-Rindler coordinates.
1907 Hermann Minkowski defined the relation between the four-force (which he called the moving force) and the four acceleration

1908 Minkowski denotes the second derivative  with respect to proper time as "acceleration vector" (four-acceleration).
1909 Max Born denotes the motion with constant magnitude of Minkowski's acceleration vector as "hyperbolic motion", in the course of his study of rigidly accelerated motion.
.
He also noticed that his transformation can be used to transform into a "hyperbolically accelerated reference system".
1909 Gustav Herglotz extends Born's investigation to all possible cases of rigidly accelerated motion, including uniform rotation.

1911 Herglotz explicitly used the expression "rest acceleration" instead of proper acceleration.
1911 Max von Laue derived in the first edition of his monograph "Das Relativitätsprinzip" the transformation for three-acceleration by differentiation of the velocity addition

From that he derived the transformation of rest acceleration (equivalent to ), and eventually the formulas for hyperbolic motion which corresponds to :

thus
,
and the transformation into a hyperbolic reference system with imaginary angle :
.
He also wrote the transformation of three-force as

1912–1914 Friedrich Kottler obtained general covariance of Maxwell's equations, and used four-dimensional Frenet-Serret formulas to analyze the Born rigid motions given by Herglotz (1909). He also obtained the proper reference frames for hyperbolic motion and uniform circular motion.
He showed, that the magnitude of four-acceleration corresponds to the rest acceleration  by
,
Subsequently, he derived the same formulas as in 1911 for the transformation of rest acceleration and hyperbolic motion, and the hyperbolic reference frame.

References

Bibliography

; First edition 1911, second expanded edition 1913, third expanded edition 1919.

 
In English:

Historical papers

External links
 Mathpages: Transverse Mass in Einstein's Electrodynamics, Accelerated Travels, Born Rigidity, Acceleration, and Inertia, Does A Uniformly Accelerating Charge Radiate?
 Physics FAQ: Acceleration in Special Relativity, The Relativistic Rocket

Special relativity
Acceleration